Dataganj  Assembly constituency is  one of the 403 constituencies of the Uttar Pradesh Legislative Assembly,  India. It is a part of the Badaun district and one  of the five assembly constituencies in the Aonla Lok Sabha constituency. First election in this assembly constituency was held in 1957 after the "DPACO (1956)" (delimitation order) was passed in 1956. After the "Delimitation of Parliamentary and Assembly Constituencies Order" was passed in 2008, the constituency was assigned identification number 117.

Wards  / Areas
Extent  of Dataganj Assembly constituency is KCs Samrer, Dataganj, Hazratpur, Usawan,  Alapur NP, Usawan NP, Usehat NP & Dataganj NP of Dataganj Tehsil.

Members of the Legislative Assembly

Election results

2022

2017
Seventeenth  Legislative Assembly of Uttar Pradesh

See also
Aonla Lok Sabha constituency
Budaun district
Seventeenth Legislative Assembly of Uttar Pradesh
Uttar Pradesh Legislative Assembly
Vidhan Bhawan

References

External links
 

Assembly constituencies of Uttar Pradesh
Politics of Budaun district
Constituencies established in 1956